Clonmel Celtic F.C. are a football club from Clonmel in Ireland. The club plays at Celtic Park and competes in the Tipperary Southern & District Football League.

The club colours are green shirts, white shorts and green socks.

The club competed in the FAI Cup in 2015, but did not make it past the first round.

References

Clonmel
Association football clubs in County Tipperary
2003 establishments in Ireland
Association football clubs established in 2003